An eccentric Jupiter is a Jovian planet that orbits its star in an eccentric orbit. Eccentric Jupiters may probably disqualify a planetary system from having Earth-like planets (though not always from having habitable exomoons) in it because a massive gas giant with an eccentric orbit may remove all Earth mass exoplanets from the habitable zone, if not from the system entirely.

The planets of the solar system, except for Mercury, have orbits with an eccentricity of less than 0.1 and are moving in a state close to a perfect circle. However, two-thirds of the exoplanets discovered in 2006 have elliptical orbits with an eccentricity of 0.2 or more. The typical exoplanet with an orbital period greater than 5 days has a median eccentricity of 0.23. This, together with Hot Jupiter, provided an opportunity to fundamentally review the theory of solar system formation so far.

History of discovery 
Eccentric Jupiter was first confirmed in 1996. The first exoplanet around main sequence star was discovered in 51 Pegasi the previous year, but apart from that, a planet with a very large eccentricity was found around 16 Cygni, although it was farther from the central star.

The celestial bodies that revolve around 16 Cygni and 70 Virginis with an eccentricity of more than 0.5 were initially regarded as brown dwarfs. However, due to the discovery of similar objects with the mass of Jupiter and the existence of multiple planetary systems, it has become widely recognized as a typical example of exoplanets.

Origin of orbit formation 
There are various theories about the origin of the distorted orbit compared to the planets of the solar system, but if there is a hot Jupiter in a multi-planetary system, it can be explained by a relatively simple model called "slingshot model". The following is an example of calculation of orbital evolution by computer simulation.

In any planetary system, the orbit of the planet is initially born in a state close to a perfect circle, but if there are three or more gas giant planets , the orbit will probably be distorted after a certain period of time. One of the planets will be thrown out of the system, and the remaining two planets will also be in orbits with a very high eccentricity.

This is due to the fact that the energy exchanged between the three planets during their revolution is concentrated on a specific planet. This phenomenon almost always occurs after a certain period of time (with an error of 1-2 digits), but when there are two or less giant gas planets (that is, only Jupiter and Saturn in the solar system), it is more stable that the period of time is much longer than the life of a standard star, and it is virtually stable in a circular orbit. Therefore, there is a calculation result that each planet remains in a circular orbit semi-permanently in the solar system. On the other hand, if there are three or more giant gas planets, the "fixed period" will be greatly affected by the mass and orbital spacing of the planets. If a massive planet has a narrow orbital spacing, the period will be shorter than the life of the star, and orbital crossing will occur shortly after the formation of the planetary system.

Another theory has pointed out that the interaction between giant planets and protoplanetary disks may increase eccentricity. However, it is difficult to explain an eccentric planet with an eccentricity exceeding 0.4 with this mechanism. Also, if the planet is orbiting a star belonging to a star system, the gravity of the companion star may increase the orbital eccentricity.

Relation to hot Jupiter 
There is a theory that Hot Jupiter, which revolves near the main star, is a change in the orbit of the eccentric planet. Eccentric Jupiter is near point 0.05 stellar in AU if it has an elongated elliptical orbit so as to approach to the extent, from the main star tidal brake is applied to the revolution around the near point by. As a result, while maintaining the near point distance far point only the distance is gradually reduced, ultimately is that settle on a smaller radius of the circular orbit  . For example, the eccentric planet HD 80606 b has an extremely elliptical orbit with a perigee distance of 0.03 au and apogee distance of 0.87 au, and may be a celestial body that is transitioning to a hot Jupiter with an orbital radius of 0.03 au.

The problem with this model is that tidal forces weaken rapidly over distance (inversely proportional to the cube of the distance), so you must continue to orbit closer to the main star to get sufficient braking. As an example, if another giant planet exists outside the celestial body that is transitioning to Hot Jupiter, its gravity will change the perigee distance of the inner planet, and if it is too far from the main star, the tidal force will be almost ineffective. In addition, Hot Jupiter has been found at a position slightly distant from the main star (0.1 au or more), but another model is needed to explain these.

Confusion with multiplanetary system 
Some of the detected eccentric planets may actually be multiple planets with near-circular orbits. The majority of eccentric planets have been reported based on radial velocity measurements using Doppler spectroscopy by which eccentricity is directly measurable. In the case where the planet is in a circular orbit, the fluctuation pattern of the radial velocity is a simple sine curve, but in the case of an elliptical orbit, it deviates from the sine curve and is recognized as an eccentric planet. However, such a distorted waveform can also occur due to the synthesis of radial velocity fluctuations caused by multiple planets. The two cannot be distinguished if the radial velocity sampling is insufficient (the number of times is small, only a part of the orbital period can be covered, etc.)  . In this situation, the simplest model that can reproduce the observations is preferred to be a single eccentric planet rather than a multi-planetary system.

Due to these circumstances, there are cases where the planet, which was initially reported as an eccentric planet, turns out to be a multi-planetary system with a low eccentricity due to the accumulation of observations and improvements in analytical techniques. As an example, a study that re-examined 82 planetary systems that were alleged to have a single eccentric planet in 2013 found that multi-planetary models were statistically clearly better than single-planet models. 9 have been found.

The situation where multiple planetary systems and eccentric planets are confused is likely to occur in cases where the waveform distortion is relatively small, such as when the eccentricity is 0.5 or less when interpreted as a single planet. On the other hand, the eccentric planet, which has an extreme orbit with an eccentricity of 0.5 or more, is considered to have little room for being mistaken for a multiplanetary system.

List 
Possible habitable zone planets near eccentric Jupiters:

See also

References

Types of planet